Dragočajna (in older sources also Dragočajn,  or Dragotschain) is a village on the left bank of the Sava River in the Municipality of Medvode in the Upper Carniola region of Slovenia.

Name
The settlement was first attested in 1455 as Dragotschein. The name is derived from *Dragočajina, based on the Slavic personal name Dragoča(jь), and thus originally meant 'Dragoča's settlement'. The settlement was known as Dragotschein or Dragotschain in German in the past.

References

External links

Dragočajna on Geopedia

Populated places in the Municipality of Medvode